Devontae Calvin Cacok (born October 8, 1996) is an American professional basketball player for CSKA Moscow of the VTB United League. He played college basketball for the UNC Wilmington Seahawks, where in the 2017–18 season he led the nation in rebounding.

Early life
Cacok was born in Chicago, Illinois to a Haitian-American father Harry Cacok and Rose Lewis, and grew up in Riverdale, Georgia, playing football as a youth, mainly on the offensive line. He first began playing basketball in eight grade after he fractured his wrist, ending his football season. Cacok admits being terrible at first, but joined his high school varsity team after a seven-inch growth spurt as a sophomore. As a senior at Alpharetta High School, he averaged 22 points and 12 rebounds per game and led the team to a regional title.

College career
As a freshman at UNC Wilmington, Cacok came off the bench to average 3.3 points per game. Cacok averaged 12.2 points and 9.8 rebounds per game as a sophomore and led the nation in field goal percentage (80.0%). He accomplished this extremely high percentage, the highest ever, by mainly shooting within a range of about two feet from the basket and only taking one jump shot all year on the 29–6 Seahawks team. He had 40 blocks and tied for the league lead with 11 double-doubles. He was named CAA Defensive Player of the Year and was selected to the Third Team All-CAA.

After the season, UNC Wilmington lost four starters and coach Kevin Keatts; new coach C. B. McGrath looked to expand his overall game. In an 87–63 win against Elon in February 2018, Cacok posted 17 points and 21 rebounds. The following matchup, an 88–64 loss to College of Charleston, he had 29 points and 17 rebounds. These two performances earned him CBS Sports Player of the Week honors. As a junior, Cacok led Division I in rebounding with 13.5 per game. He finished eighth in the CAA in scoring with 17.8 points per game and third in field goal percentage with 58.8%. Cacok led the conference with 22 double-doubles, second-most of any player in the country. He was named to the First Team All-CAA. The North Carolina Collegiate Sports Information Association named Cacok to the First Team All-State.

Coming into his senior season, Cacok was named to the Preseason First Team All-CAA. As a senior, Cacok averaged 15.2 points and 12.3 rebounds per game and led the nation in double-doubles with 22. He was again selected to the First Team All-CAA.

Professional career

Los Angeles Lakers (2019–2021)
After going undrafted in the 2019 NBA draft, Cacok signed an Exhibit 10 contract with the Los Angeles Lakers to play in the 2019 NBA Summer League. On October 21, 2019, Cacok was waived by the Lakers. He was then added to the roster of the South Bay Lakers of the NBA G League.

On December 11, 2019, Cacok signed a two-way contract with the Los Angeles Lakers, where he would split time between South Bay and LA. On December 28, 2019, Cacok grabbed a career-high 19 rebounds to go along with 22 points in a 124–120 win over the Northern Arizona Suns. He suffered a stress reaction in his foot on January 13, sidelining him for several weeks. Cacok returned to action on February 1, contributing 13 points and seven rebounds in a win over the Rio Grande Valley Vipers. At the close of the season, Cacok was named to the All-NBA G League First Team after averaging 19.4 points, 11.4 rebounds and 1.1 steals per game. He was also named to the League's All-Rookie Team. On August 13, he made his NBA debut for the Lakers, scoring six points on 3-of-6 shooting and grabbing five rebounds in a 136–122 loss to the Sacramento Kings. Cacok won his first championship when the Lakers defeated the Miami Heat in the 2020 NBA Finals.

On September 20, 2021, Cacok signed with the Brooklyn Nets. He was waived at the end of training camp on October 16.

San Antonio Spurs (2021–2022)
On October 18, the San Antonio Spurs claimed Cacok off waivers and converted his deal into a two-way contract with the Austin Spurs. On March 4, 2022, the San Antonio Spurs converted Cacok's contract into a standard deal.

Motor City Cruise (2022–2023) 
On September 7, 2022, the Portland Trail Blazers announced that they had signed Cacok. He was waived on October 7.

On November 3, 2022, Cacok was named to the opening night roster for the Motor City Cruise.

CSKA Moscow (2023–present) 
On February 11, 2023, he signed with CSKA Moscow of the VTB United League.

Career statistics

NBA

Regular season

|-
| style="text-align:left; background:#afe6ba;"| 
| style="text-align:left;"| L.A. Lakers
| 1 || 0 || 9.0 || .500 ||  ||  || 5.0 || 1.0 || .0 || .0 || 6.0
|-
| style="text-align:left;"| 
| style="text-align:left;"| L.A. Lakers
| 20 || 1 || 4.0 || .586 ||  || .455 || 1.6 || .1 || .3 || .2 || 2.0
|-
| style="text-align:left;"| 
| style="text-align:left;"| San Antonio
| 15 || 0 || 8.1 || .677 ||  || .571 || 2.8 || .4 || .5 || .5 || 3.1
|- class="sortbottom"
| style="text-align:center;" colspan="2"| Career
| 36 || 1 || 6.3 || .621 ||  || .500 || 2.2 || .2 || .4 || .3 || 2.5

References

External links

 UNC Wilmington Seahawks bio
 College stats at Sports-reference.com

1996 births
Living people
21st-century African-American sportspeople
African-American basketball players
American men's basketball players
Austin Spurs players
Basketball players from Georgia (U.S. state)
Centers (basketball)
Los Angeles Lakers players
People from Alpharetta, Georgia
Power forwards (basketball)
San Antonio Spurs players
South Bay Lakers players
Sportspeople from Fulton County, Georgia
UNC Wilmington Seahawks men's basketball players
Undrafted National Basketball Association players